Amata phaeozona is a moth of the family Erebidae. It was described by Zerny in 1912. It is found in Tanzania.

References

 Natural History Museum Lepidoptera generic names catalog

Endemic fauna of Tanzania
phaeozona
Moths described in 1912
Moths of Africa